"Let It Be Me" is a song by American punk rock band Social Distortion from their 1990 self-titled album. Released as a single, it charted on the Billboard Modern Rock Tracks chart at No. 11. A live version appears on their Live at the Roxy live album.

Track listing
"Let It Be Me"
"It's All Over Now"
"Pretty Thing"

Personnel
Mike Ness - lead vocals, lead guitar
Dennis Danell - rhythm guitar
John Maurer - bass guitar, backing vocals
Christopher Reece - drums

1990 songs
Social Distortion songs
Songs written by Mike Ness
Epic Records singles